Syrian League 1st Division is the second division in football in Syria. It is operated by the Syrian Football Association (SFA). The league began to play in 1960s. After each season the two top clubs are promoted to the Premier League, and the bottom clubs are relegated to the Syrian League 2nd Division. In the 2021–22 season, Al-Majd and Al-Jazeera SC won the title and they were promoted to Premier League.

In 2021–22 season, the league consists of 24 clubs divided into 4 groups based on their geographical distribution. However, the final round consists of 8 teams divided into two groups.

Current clubs (2021–22)

 Group 1
 Al-Arabi
 Al-Muhafaza
 Al-Yaqdhah
 Al-Dumayr
 Al-Nabek
 Al Kesswa
 Group 2
 Al-Majd
 Jaramana
 Al-Shouleh
 Al-Mayadin
 Artouz
 Muadamiyat al-Sham
 Group 3
 Al-Sahel
 Baniyas Refinery
 Al-Tadamon
 Shorta Hama
 Morek
 Al-Mukharram
 Group 4
 Al-Jazeera
 Al-Jihad
 Al-Hurriya
 Ommal Hama
 Amuda
 Al-Khittab

Champions

2004-2005: Al-Jihad SC
2005-2006: Al-Shorta SC
2006-2007: Nawair SC & Afrin SC
2007-2008: Al-Wathba SC & Omayya SC
2008-2009: Al-Jazeera SC & Afrin SC
2009-2010: Hutteen SC & Al-Fotuwa SC
2010-2011: Baniyas Refinery SC & Al-Hurriya SC
2011-2012 Al-Muhafaza SC & Al-Jihad SC
2012-2013: N/A
2013-2014: Al-Nidal SC
2014-2015: N/A
2015-2016: N/A
2016-2017: Al-Herafyeen SC
2017-2018: Sahel SC
2018-2019: Al-Jazeera SC & Al-Fotuwa SC
2019-2020: Al-Hurriya SC & Al-Horgelah SC
2020-2021: Nawair SC & Afrin SC
2021-2022: Al-Jazeera SC & Al-Majd SC

Notes

References

External link
 الدوري السوري - الدرجة الأولى 2020/2021 in Arabic

1960s establishments in Syria
Football leagues in Syria